The Quechua alphabet is based on the Latin alphabet. It is used to write the Quechuan languages. The Quechua alphabet has been use in Peru since 1975, following the Officialization of Quechua by Decree Law in May 1975 that made Quechua co-equal with Spanish.

Current orthography

For native words 
The number of letters employed in writing Quechua highly depends on the Quechua dialect. However, the following are the core letters generally used:

In some dialects, vowel lengths are distinguished by doubling vowel letters to indicate that a vowel is long:

In yet other dialects, with additional sounds, additional letters are employed:

For loanwords 
Quechua employs additional letters to write loanwords, mainly originating from Spanish. In careful speech, the letters may represent a Spanish sound, but generally the Spanish sound is replaced with a native sound.

For phonetic transcription 
For phonetic transcription, four additional letters are used:

See also 
 Academia Mayor de la Lengua Quechua

References 

Latin alphabets
Quechuan languages